Frederick Russell Winchell (born Frederick Cook, January 23, 1882 – August 8, 1958) was a professional baseball pitcher. He appeared in four games in Major League Baseball for the Cleveland Naps during the 1909 season.

Winchell played college baseball at Princeton University.

References

External links

Major League Baseball pitchers
Cleveland Naps players
San Antonio Bronchos players
Princeton Tigers baseball players
Baseball players from Massachusetts
1882 births
1958 deaths